Simon Henderson (born 1976) is a British teacher. He has been Head Master of Eton College since 2015, having previously served as headmaster of Bradfield College.

Education
Henderson studied at Winchester College, and later received a bachelor's degree and Postgraduate Certificate in Education (PGCE) in history from the  University of Oxford where he was a student of Brasenose College, Oxford.

Career
Henderson first worked as a history and politics teacher at The Windsor Boys' School, before joining Eton College in 2001; he soon became head of history at the school. From 2009, he served as Deputy Head of Sherborne School. He left Sherborne in 2011 when he was appointed Headmaster of Bradfield College.

Eton College
In 2015, Henderson was appointed Head Master of Eton College, being the youngest so far at 39 years old. In the same year, he became a governor of Holyport College and the London Academy of Excellence.

During the COVID-19 pandemic in the United Kingdom, he expanded Eton's online learning platform EtonX to state pupils and opened the school's accommodation to Key workers. He stated his interest in widening the school's intake to those of different backgrounds, saying "we want talented boys to be able to come to Eton whatever their financial circumstances". In response to a parent and alumni-led petition after the murder of George Floyd in May 2020, he pledged to focus more on teaching about systemic racism and "decolonising" aspects of the school. He also stated he would increase efforts in diversifying the faculty after it was pointed out that there were only two black teachers at the school.

Personal life
Henderson's wife, Ali, worked as a civil servant at 10 Downing Street under Tony Blair and Gordon Brown. She is now the Chief Executive of Royal SpringBoard, a social mobility charity. They have two sons and two daughters.

References

Living people
1976 births
Alumni of Brasenose College, Oxford
People educated at Winchester College
Head Masters of Eton College
Headmasters of Bradfield College